Masita Mahmudin (born 2 March 1995) is an Indonesian badminton player affiliated with Jaya Raya Jakarta club. She was the silver medalists at the 2013 World Junior Championships in the mixed team and doubles event. Mahmudin also part of the national junior team that won the bronze medal at the 2013 Asian Junior Championships.

Achievements

BWF World Junior Championships 
Mixed doubles

BWF Grand Prix (1 runner-up) 
The BWF Grand Prix had two levels, the Grand Prix and Grand Prix Gold. It was a series of badminton tournaments sanctioned by the Badminton World Federation (BWF) and played between 2007 and 2017.

Mixed doubles

 BWF Grand Prix Gold tournament
 BWF Grand Prix tournament

BWF International Challenge/Series (2 titles, 2 runners-up) 
Mixed doubles

  BWF International Challenge tournament
  BWF International Series tournament

BWF Junior International (2 titles) 
Girls' doubles

Mixed doubles

  BWF Junior International Grand Prix tournament
  BWF Junior International Challenge tournament
  BWF Junior International Series tournament
  BWF Junior Future Series tournament

Performance timeline

National team 
 Junior level

Individual competitions

Junior level  
 Girls' doubles

 Mixed doubles

Senior level

Women's doubles

Mixed doubles

References 

1995 births
Living people
People from Jambi (city)
Sportspeople from Jambi
Indonesian female badminton players
20th-century Indonesian women